Nyayapathi Venkata Vaikuntha Jagannatha Swamy was a mathematical physicist. He is well known for his contributions to the physics of relativistic harmonic oscillator
which found wide applications in Atomic, Nuclear and High Energy Physics. Some of the citations to Swamy's work on the relativistic oscillator are given in references. A review of the history and the generalized treatment of the relativistic harmonic oscillator is given by Lisboa et al.

He is also well known for his group theoretical contributions to mathematical physics. His widely used textbook co-authored with Mark A. Samuel, 
"Group Theory Made Easy for Scientists and Engineers" (Wiley-Interscience 1979), was very popular.

L.C. Bidenharn and Swamy published very influential papers on the relativistic Kepler problem. They introduced a symmetric Hamiltonian and solved the Dirac Equation for the Hydrogen atom. The history of this effort is given in Harold V. McIntosh's website.

Background and career
Swamy received a BS degree in Mathematics, a BS and MS degree in Physics all from Bombay University, and a PhD degree in Physics from Florida State University. He had lectured at many universities, and was a guest scientist in Jülich, 
Germany and Cambridge University in UK. He had served as a professor of physics at 
Oklahoma State University until his retirement.

Since his retirement in mid eighties, he used his own funds to visit India and teach at various academic institutions.

Dr Swamy died in his hometown of Visakhapatnam in India on 13 June 2013.

Books
 Nyayapathi V.V.J. Swamy and Mark A. Samuel, Group Theory Made Easy for Scientists and Engineers, Wiley-Interscience, 1979,

References

Year of birth missing (living people)
Living people
20th-century Indian physicists
Mathematical physicists
Indian theoretical physicists
Florida State University alumni
Oklahoma State University faculty
Indian emigrants to the United States